The 1911 New York Highlanders season saw the team finishing with a total of 76 wins and 76 losses, coming in 6th in the American League.

New York was managed by Hal Chase. Home games were played at Hilltop Park. The alternate and equally unofficial nickname, "Yankees", was being used more and more frequently by the press.

Regular season 
Relations between the New York Highlanders and the enemy New York Giants seemed to be at a boiling point until a fateful April day when a fire destroyed the main portion of the grandstand at the Polo Grounds, the Giants' home field just a few blocks away (and downhill) from the Hilltop. The Highlanders invited the Giants to play at Hilltop Park for the remainder of the 1911 season. Although the Giants were able to return to their partially rebuilt home two months later, this good deed would be remembered and returned to the Highlanders two years later.

Season standings

Record vs. opponents

Roster

Player stats

Batting

Starters by position 
Note: Pos = Position; G = Games played; AB = At bats; H = Hits; Avg. = Batting average; HR = Home runs; RBI = Runs batted in

Other batters 
Note: G = Games played; AB = At bats; H = Hits; Avg. = Batting average; HR = Home runs; RBI = Runs batted in

Pitching

Starting pitchers 
Note: G = Games pitched; IP = Innings pitched; W = Wins; L = Losses; ERA = Earned run average; SO = Strikeouts

Other pitchers 
Note: G = Games pitched; IP = Innings pitched; W = Wins; L = Losses; ERA = Earned run average; SO = Strikeouts

Relief pitchers 
Note: G = Games pitched; W = Wins; L = Losses; SV = Saves; ERA = Earned run average; SO = Strikeouts

External links 

1911 New York Highlanders team page at www.baseball-almanac.com
1911 New York Highlanders at Baseball Reference

New York Yankees seasons
New York Highlanders
New York Highlanders
1910s in Manhattan
Washington Heights, Manhattan